The Collegiate Marching Band Festival, also called the CMBF, is an annual event held in Allentown, Pennsylvania, which showcases college and university marching bands of all sizes and styles from across the Northeastern United States. First held in 1996, the event typically takes places in early October at J. Birney Crum Stadium, a renowned venue for marching band and drum corps performances and the second largest high school football stadium in Pennsylvania. The festival is not a competition, but rather an opportunity for fans and band members alike to view bands that perform a variety of shows and exhibit different performance styles.

Management and sponsors

The festival is currently managed by Vivace Productions, Inc. in West Chester, Pennsylvania.

Different Styles
While many of the participating bands perform contemporary “corps style” shows using roll-step marching, other performance varieties abound. Morgan State University, from Baltimore, Maryland, performs a high-energy show typical of southern HBCU bands. Lehigh University and Penn State University, both of which have participated in the past, perform traditional "Big Ten" style shows with a high-step marching technique. Other bands, including Indiana University of Pennsylvania, Kutztown University, West Chester University, The University of Delaware, and the University of Massachusetts Amherst, have developed unique styles all their own.

Traditions
Celebrating its 21st occurrence in 2016, the festival has a number of traditions, which spectators and performers have come to anticipate on an annual basis.

Order of performance
The order of performance is rotated on an annual basis although it still follows a pattern where smaller-sized bands perform early in the day and larger bands perform later. As a custom, the first band to perform also plays the National Anthem to signify the start of the festival.

Vendors
The festival features an area for vendors to set up information booths. Vendors have included companies involved in the marching arts, drum and bugle corps from both Drum Corps International and Drum Corps Associates, and recruiting tables for participating schools.

Concessions
J. Birney Crum Stadium boasts some eccentric food choices. Among them can be found fried pierogies and giant Hawaiian Shave Ices that resemble softball-sized snow cones. Many festival-goers make these treats a regular part of the annual event.

Musical Organizations
The Collegiate Marching Band Festival is traditionally staffed by the Eta Rho chapter of Kappa Kappa Psi and the Zeta Upsilon chapter of Tau Beta Sigma. Members of these organizations from several chapters use the festival as a time to gather together and socialize while engaging in their own particular traditions. 
Additional musical fraternities such as Phi Mu Alpha also congregate at this time.
Alumni and members of area drum corps gather and socialize at the event; most notably the Reading Buccaneers gather annually at the end of the event on or near the field. 
Students, staff, and alumni from the participating bands take this opportunity to commingle with other members and before all the schools depart. 
Many of the organizations sing their respective hymn/song before departing the festival.

Tubas/Sousaphones
After the last band performs, the tuba and sousaphone players from several of the larger bands congregate at the center of the field to play traditional tunes, socialize with each other, and generally put on a humorous display for the exiting crowds.  This congregation is called "The Clusterfun".

Performing Ensembles (2003-2014)

8th Annual CMBF
Sunday, September 21, 2003 - Order of Appearance
Kutztown University Marching Unit
Lehigh University – Marching 97
Lebanon Valley College – The Pride of the Valley
Gettysburg College – Bullet Marching Band
Boston University – Terrier Marching Band
California University of Pennsylvania Marching Band
Millersville University – Marauder Marching Band
Shippensburg University – Red Raider Marching Band
Shepherd University – Ram Band
Morgan State University – The Magnificent Marching Machine
Indiana University of Pennsylvania – The Legend
Liberty University – The Spirit of the Mountain
University of Massachusetts Amherst – Minuteman Marching Band The Power and Class of New England
Mansfield University – The Pride of Pennsylvania
University of Delaware – Fightin’ Blue Hen Marching Band
West Chester University – Incomparable Golden Rams Marching Band

9th Annual CMBF
Sunday, October 10, 2004 - Order of Appearance
Clarion University – Golden Eagle Marching Band
Lebanon Valley College – The Pride of the Valley
Kutztown University Marching Unit
Boston University – Terrier Marching Band
Gettysburg College – Bullet Marching Band
California University of Pennsylvania Marching Band
Millersville University – Marauder Marching Band
Towson University – Tiger Marching Band
Temple University – Diamond Marching Band
Shepherd University – Ram Band
Mansfield University – The Pride of Pennsylvania
Slippery Rock University – The Marching Pride
Morgan State University – The Magnificent Marching Machine
Shippensburg University – Red Raider Marching Band
West Chester University – Incomparable Golden Rams Marching Band
University of Delaware – Fightin’ Blue Hen Marching Band
Indiana University of Pennsylvania – The Legend
University of Massachusetts Amherst – Minuteman Marching Band The Power and Class of New England

10th Annual CMBF
Sunday, October 2, 2005 - Order of Appearance
East Stroudsburg University of Pennsylvania – Warrior Marching Band
Clarion University – Golden Eagle Marching Band
Kutztown University Marching Unit
Lebanon Valley College – The Pride of the Valley
Shepherd University – Ram Band
Slippery Rock University – The Marching Pride
Liberty University – The Spirit of the Mountain
Boston University – Terrier Marching Band
California University of Pennsylvania Marching Band
Towson University – Tiger Marching Band
Morgan State University – The Magnificent Marching Machine
Millersville University – Marauder Marching Band
Shippensburg University – Red Raider Marching Band
Mansfield University – The Pride of Pennsylvania
University of Massachusetts Amherst – Minuteman Marching Band The Power and Class of New England
University of Delaware – Fightin’ Blue Hen Marching Band
West Chester University – Incomparable Golden Rams Marching Band
Indiana University of Pennsylvania – The Legend

11th Annual CMBF
Sunday, October 8, 2006 - Order of Appearance
Clarion University – Golden Eagle Marching Band
East Stroudsburg University – Warrior Marching Band
Shepherd University – Ram Band
Slippery Rock University – The Marching Pride
Lebanon Valley College – The Pride of the Valley
Kutztown University Marching Unit
California University of Pennsylvania Marching Band
Millersville University – Marauder Marching Band
Morgan State University – The Magnificent Marching Machine
Temple University – Diamond Marching Band
Towson University – Tiger Marching Band
Indiana University of Pennsylvania – The Legend
University of Delaware – Fightin’ Blue Hen Marching Band
Shippensburg University – Red Raider Marching Band
Mansfield University – The Spirit and the Pride
University of Massachusetts Amherst – Minuteman Marching Band The Power and Class of New England
West Chester University – Incomparable Golden Rams Marching Band

12th Annual CMBF
Sunday, September 30, 2007 - Order of Appearance
Moravian College – Greyhound Marching Band & Color Guard
East Stroudsburg University – Warrior Marching Band
Boston University – Terrier Marching Band
Millersville University – Marauder Marching Band
Clarion University – Golden Eagle Marching Band
Slippery Rock University – The Marching Pride
California University of Pennsylvania Marching Band
Kutztown University Marching Unit
Shepherd University – Ram Band
Shippensburg University – Red Raider Marching Band
Towson University – Tiger Marching Band
Lebanon Valley College – The Pride of the Valley
Morgan State University – The Magnificent Marching Machine
Gettysburg College – Bullets Marching Band
Indiana University of Pennsylvania – The Legend
West Chester University – Incomparable Golden Rams Marching Band
Liberty University – The Spirit of the Mountain
University of Massachusetts Amherst – Minuteman Marching Band The Power and Class of New England
Mansfield University – The Spirit and the Pride
University of Delaware – Fightin’ Blue Hen Marching Band

13th Annual CMBF
Sunday, September 28, 2008 - Order Of Appearance

Bloomsburg University – Maroon & Gold Marching Band
Moravian College – Greyhound Marching Band & Color Guard
Millersville University – Marauder Marching Band
East Stroudsburg University – Warrior Marching Band
Cheyney University – Wolves Marching Band
Clarion University – Golden Eagle Marching Band
Gettysburg College – Bullets Marching Band
Boston University – Terrier Marching Band
Kutztown University Marching Unit
Lebanon Valley College – The Pride of the Valley
California University of Pennsylvania Marching Band
Slippery Rock University – The Marching Pride
Shepherd University – Ram Band
Towson University – Tiger Marching Band
Temple University – Diamond Marching Band
Shippensburg University – Red Raider Marching Band
Morgan State University – The Magnificent Marching Machine
Mansfield University – The Spirit and the Pride
University of Delaware – Fightin’ Blue Hen Marching Band
Indiana University of Pennsylvania – The Legend
West Chester University – Incomparable Golden Rams Marching Band
University of Massachusetts Amherst – Minuteman Marching Band The Power and Class of New England

14th Annual CMBF
Sunday, October 4, 2009 - Order Of Appearance

Moravian College – Greyhound Marching Band & Color Guard
Bloomsburg University – Maroon & Gold Marching Band
Millersville University – Marauder Marching Band
East Stroudsburg University – Warrior Marching Band
Clarion University – Golden Eagle Marching Band
Cheyney University – Wolves Marching Band
Gettysburg College – Bullets Marching Band
Lebanon Valley College – The Pride of the Valley
Kutztown University Marching Unit
California University of PA Marching Band
Slippery Rock University – The Marching Pride
University of New Hampshire – Wildcat Marching Band
Shippensburg University – Red Raider Marching Band
Towson University – Tiger Marching Band
Shepherd University – Ram Band
Morgan State University – The Magnificent Marching Machine
University of Massachusetts Amherst – Minuteman Marching Band The Power and Class of New England
Mansfield University – The Spirit and the Pride
University of Delaware – Fightin’ Blue Hen Marching Band
Indiana University of Pennsylvania – The Legend
West Chester University – Incomparable Golden Rams Marching Band

15th Annual CMBF
Sunday, October 3, 2010 - Order Of Appearance

Lehigh University – Marching 97
East Stroudsburg University – Warrior Marching Band
Millersville University – Marauder Marching Band
Cheyney University – Wolves Marching Band
Moravian College – Greyhound Marching Band & Color Guard
Clarion University – Golden Eagle Marching Band
Bloomsburg University – Maroon & Gold Marching Band
Lebanon Valley College – The Pride of the Valley
Kutztown University Marching Unit
California University of PA Marching Band
Morgan State University – The Magnificent Marching Machine
Towson University – Tiger Marching Band
Shepherd University – Ram Band
Shippensburg University – Red Raider Marching Band
Slippery Rock University – The Marching Pride
Mansfield University – The Spirit and the Pride
Indiana University of Pennsylvania – The Legend
West Chester University – Incomparable Golden Rams Marching Band
University of Delaware – Fightin’ Blue Hen Marching Band
University of Massachusetts Amherst – Minuteman Marching Band The Power and Class of New England

16th Annual CMBF
Sunday, September 25, 2011 - Order of Appearance

College of the Holy Cross - "Goodtime" Marching Band
Clark University
Gettysburg College – Bullets Marching Band
East Stroudsburg University – Warrior Marching Band
Clarion University – Golden Eagle Marching Band
Moravian College – Greyhound Marching Band & Color Guard
Cheyney University – Wolves Marching Band
Kutztown University Marching Unit
Lebanon Valley College – The Pride of the Valley
Bloomsburg University – Maroon & Gold Marching Band
Millersville University – Marauder Marching Band
California University of PA Marching Band
Morgan State University – The Magnificent Marching Machine
Rutgers University – Marching Scarlet Knights
Shepherd University – Ram Band
Towson University – Tiger Marching Band
Shippensburg University – Red Raider Marching Band
Slippery Rock University – The Marching Pride
University of Massachusetts Amherst – Minuteman Marching Band The Power and Class of New England
Mansfield University – The Spirit and the Pride
Indiana University of Pennsylvania – The Legend
West Chester University – Incomparable Golden Rams Marching Band
University of Delaware – Fightin’ Blue Hen Marching Band

17th Annual CMBF
Sunday, September 30, 2012 - Order of Appearance

Boston University - BU Marching Band
East Stroudsburg University – Warrior Marching Band
Clarion University – Golden Eagle Marching Band
Moravian College – Greyhound Marching Band & Color Guard
Cheyney University – Wolves Marching Band
Millersville University – Marauder Marching Band
Kutztown University Marching Unit
Gettysburg College – Bullets Marching Band
Bloomsburg University – Maroon & Gold Marching Band
California University of PA Marching Band
Morgan State University – The Magnificent Marching Machin
Lebanon Valley College – The Pride of the Valley
Indiana University of Pennsylvania – The Legend
Shepherd University – Ram Band
Shippensburg University – Red Raider Marching Band
Towson University – Tiger Marching Band
Rutgers University – Marching Scarlet Knights
Slippery Rock University – The Marching Pride
University of Delaware – Fightin’ Blue Hen Marching Band
University of Massachusetts Amherst – Minuteman Marching Band The Power and Class of New England
Mansfield University – The Spirit and the Pride
West Chester University – Incomparable Golden Rams Marching Band

18th Annual CMBF
Sunday, September 29, 2013 - Order of Appearance

Lock Haven University - Bald Eagle Marching Band
Clarion University – Golden Eagle Marching Band
Cheyney University – "Soulful Sound" Marching Band
Moravian College – Greyhound Marching Band & Color Guard
Boston University - BU Marching Band
East Stroudsburg University – Warrior Marching Band
Kutztown University Marching Unit
Shepherd University – Ram Band
Millersville University – Marauder Marching Band
University of New Hampshire - Wildcat Marching Band
Morgan State University – The Magnificent Marching Machine
Gettysburg College – Bullets Marching Band
Lebanon Valley College – The Pride of the Valley
Bloomsburg University – Husky Marching Band
California University of PA Marching Band
Indiana University of Pennsylvania – The Legend
Shippensburg University – Red Raider Marching Band
Slippery Rock University – The Marching Pride
Rutgers University – Marching Scarlet Knights
Towson University – Tiger Marching Band
Mansfield University – The Spirit and the Pride
West Chester University – Incomparable Golden Rams Marching Band
University of Delaware – Fightin’ Blue Hen Marching Band
University of Massachusetts Amherst – Minuteman Marching Band The Power and Class of New England

19th Annual CMBF
Sunday, September 28, 2014 - Order of Appearance

Lock Haven University - Bald Eagle Marching Band
Boston University - BU Marching Band
Clarion University – Golden Eagle Marching Band
Moravian College – Greyhound Marching Band & Color Guard
Millersville University – Marauder Marching Band
Cheyney University – "Soulful Sound" Marching Band
Kutztown University - Marching Unit
Shepherd University – Ram Band
Bloomsburg University – Husky Marching Band
Morgan State University – The Magnificent Marching Machine
Gettysburg College – Bullets Marching Band
Lebanon Valley College – The Pride of the Valley
California University of PA Marching Band
Towson University – Tiger Marching Band
Indiana University of Pennsylvania – The Legend
Shippensburg University – Red Raider Marching Band
Slippery Rock University – The Marching Pride
University of Massachusetts Amherst – Minuteman Marching Band The Power and Class of New England
Mansfield University – The Spirit and the Pride
West Chester University – Incomparable Golden Rams Marching Band
University of Delaware – Fightin’ Blue Hen Marching Band

College marching bands in the United States
Recurring events established in 1996
1996 establishments in Pennsylvania
Tourist attractions in Allentown, Pennsylvania

External link
CMBF Festival at Facebook